Dan  is a Southern Mande language spoken primarily in Ivory Coast (~800,000 speakers) and Liberia (150,000–200,000 speakers). There is also a population of about 800 speakers in Guinea.  Dan is a tonal language, with around 9-11 contour and register tones depending on the dialect.

Alternative names for the language include Yacouba or Yakubasa, Gio, Gyo, Gio-Dan, and Da. Dialects are Gio (Liberian Dan), Gweetaawu (Eastern Dan), Blowo (Western Dan), and Kla. Kla is evidently a distinct language.

Phonology

Vowels

¹Only in Liberian Dan

²Only in Eastern Dan

Consonants 

¹Only in Liberian Dan

²Not in Liberian Dan

³Not in western Dan

Writing system 
The orthography of Liberia includes this alphabet:

The capital ɤ will be encoded in a future version of The Unicode Standard.

Tones are marked as follows:
extra high tone: a̋;
high tone: á;
medium tone: ā;
low tone: à;
extra low tone: ȁ;
high drop tone: â;
extra low hanging tone: aʼ.

The digraphs  keep the same values as in the spelling of 1982, and the nasal vowels are also indicated by appending the letter n after the letter of the vowel .

References

External links
English-Dan Online Dictionary
Roberts, David, Ginger Boyd, Johannes Merz, & Valentin Vydrin. 2020. Quantifying written ambiguities in tone languages: A comparative study of Elip, Mbelime, and Eastern Dan. Language Documentation & Conservation 14: 108-138. http://hdl.handle.net/10125/24915.

Mande languages
Languages of Ivory Coast
Languages of Guinea
Languages of Liberia
Dan people